The 2016 AFF U-16 Youth Championship was the 11th edition of the AFF U-16 Youth Championship, organised by the ASEAN Football Federation for the men's under-16 national teams of Southeastern Asia. It is hosted by Cambodia for the third time after the 2007 AFF U-17 Youth Championship and 2015 AFF U-16 Youth Championship, and won by Australia. It is played between 10 July to 23 July 2016.

A total of 11 teams played in the tournament. The Indonesian Football Association was suspended by football's world governing body FIFA because of government interference in the Southeast Asian country's national league on 30 May 2015 but this was lifted on 13 May 2016. However, Indonesia withdrew from the tournament.

Players born on or after 1 January 2000 are eligible to compete in the tournament. Each team can register a maximum of 23 players (minimum three of whom must be goalkeepers).

Participant teams

All twelve member associations of the ASEAN Football Federation were set to take part in the tournament featuring three groups of four teams, but with Indonesia's suspension, they were omitted and the AFF reverted to two groups featuring six and five teams.

Venues
The two venues to host matches are Olympic Stadium and Army Stadium in Phnom Penh. The matches of Group A will hold in Olympic Stadium and Army Stadium, the matches of Group B will hold in Olympic Stadium and the matches of Knockout stage will hold in Olympic Stadium.

Schedule and draw
The following groups were drawn at the AFF Council meeting in Da Nang, Vietnam on 13 March 2016.

Seeding
The seeding are based on the 2015 AFF U-16 Youth Championship (shown in parentheses below)The 12 teams are seeded into Six pots:
Pot 1 contained the teams ranked 1–2. 
Pot 2 contained the teams ranked 3–4.
Pot 3 contained the teams ranked 5–6.
Pot 4 contained the teams ranked 7–8.
Pot 5 contained the teams ranked 9–10.
Pot 6 contained the teams ranked 11.

Each group is contain one team from each of the six pots.

The draw

Group stage
The top two teams of each group advance to the semi-finals.

Tiebreakers
The teams are ranked according to points (3 points for a win, 1 point for a draw, 0 points for a loss). If tied on points, tiebreakers are applied in the following order:
Goal difference in all the group matches;
Greater number of goals scored in all the group matches;
Result of the direct match between the teams concerned;
Kicks  from the penalty mark if the teams concerned are still on the field of play.
Lowest score using Fair Play Criteria;
Drawing of lots.

All matches held in Phnom Penh, Cambodia.
All times are local, UTC+7.

Group A

Group B

Knockout stage
In the knockout stage, penalty shoot-out is used to decide the winner if necessary (extra time is not used).

Bracket

Semi-finals

Third place match

Final

Winner

Awards

Final ranking
As per statistical convention in football, matches decided in extra time are counted as wins and losses, while matches decided by penalty shoot-outs are counted as draws.

Goalscorers

8 goals

 John Roberts

6 goals

 Nguyễn Khắc Khiêm

5 goals

 Mirza Muratovic
 Korrawit Tasa
 Peerapat Kaminthong

4 goals

 Lachlan Brook
 Bounphachan Bounkong
 Fidel Tacardon
 Nguyễn Hữu Thắng

3 goals

 Jacob Italiano
 Mark Moric
 Jinnawat Russamee
 Nguyễn Trọng Long

2 goals

 Jaidon Seldon
 Sieng Chanthea
 Mao Piseth
 Sean Sopheaktra
 Nilan Inthapanya
 Muhammad Alif Safwan Sallahuddin
 Muhammad Nizaruddin Jazi
 Aung Wanna Soe
 Hein Htet Aung
 Win Naing Tun
 Rezza Rezky Ramadhani bin Jacobjan
 Arnon Prasongporn
 Nguyễn Trần Việt Cường
 Uông Ngọc Tiến

1 goal

 Joel King
 Louis D'Arrigo
 Sin Kakada
 Yue Safy
 Muhammad Izreen Izwandy
 Muhammad Aiman Zaidi
 Bo Bo Aung
 Htet Phyoe Wai
 Ye Yint Aung
 Maquiling Leo Gabriel
 Robert Wilson
 Mohamed Daniel Matin Mohamad Azlan
 Mahler William
 Syahadat Masnawi
 Joel Chew Joon Herng
 Expedito Da Conceicao
 Osorio Gusmao
 Juvencio Ximenes
 Nititorn Supramarn
 Sumana Salapphet
 Nguyễn Huỳnh Sang
 Trần Văn Đạt
 Vũ Đình Hai
 Vũ Quang Độ

1 own goal

 Khampanhgna Keodoungdeth 
 Nelson Reis

Broadcasting

References

External links

2016 in AFF football
AFF U-16 Youth Championship
International association football competitions hosted by Cambodia
AFF
2016 in youth association football